The 19th Guam Legislature was a meeting of the Guam Legislature. It convened in Hagatna, Guam on January 5, 1987 and ended on January 2, 1989, during the 1st and 2nd years of Joseph F. Ada's 1st Gubernatorial Term.

In the 1986 Guamanian general election, the Democratic Party of Guam won a thirteen-to-eight (13-8) majority of seats in the Guam Legislature.

Senator John F. Quan died in office on June 26, 1988. John F. Quan honored after his death by the establishment of the John F. Quan Memorial Scholarships in Oceanic Research by Guam Public Law 19-37.

Party Summary

Membership

References 

Politics of Guam
Political organizations based in Guam
Legislature of Guam